Festivals of Dionysus may refer to several celebrations held in Athens in honour of the Greek god Dionysus:

The Dionysia, a festival of the Rural Dionysia and the City Dionysia, the central event of which was the performance and judging of tragedies and comedies
The Anthesteria, held annually for three days in the month of Anthesterion, concentrated on celebrating the maturation of the previous year's vintage and the beginning of spring
The Lenaia, a festival held in the month of Gamelion, including a dramatic competition which emphasized comedy more than tragedy